Micah 7 is the seventh (and the last) chapter of the Book of Micah in the Hebrew Bible or the Old Testament of the Christian Bible. This book contains the prophecies attributed to the prophet Micah, and is a part of the Book of the Twelve Minor Prophets.

Text
The original text was written in the Hebrew language. This chapter is divided into 20 verses.

Textual versions
Some early manuscripts containing the text of this chapter in Hebrew are of the Masoretic Text tradition, which includes the Codex Cairensis (895), the Petersburg Codex of the Prophets (916), Aleppo Codex (10th century), Codex Leningradensis (1008).

Fragments cumulatively containing all verses of this chapter were found among the Dead Sea Scrolls, including 4Q82 (4QXIIg; 25 BCE) with extant verses 1‑3, 20; and Wadi Murabba'at Minor Prophets (Mur88; MurXIIProph; 75-100 CE) with extant verses 1–20.

There is also a translation into Koine Greek known as the Septuagint, made in the last few centuries BCE. Extant ancient manuscripts of the Septuagint version include Codex Vaticanus (B; B; 4th century), Codex Alexandrinus (A; A; 5th century) and Codex Marchalianus (Q; Q; 6th century).

Verse 6
 For the son dishonoureth the father,
 the daughter riseth up against her mother,
 the daughter in law against her mother in law;
 a man's enemies are the men of his own house.
 Cited by Jesus Christ in 
 "For the son dishonoureth": Septuagint, ἀτιμάζει: Vulgate, contumeliam facit; literally, "treats as a fool", "despises". (Also see , etc.).
 "men of his own house": his sons and his servants, who should honour his person, defend his property, and promote his interest; but, instead of that, do everything that is injurious to him. These words are referred to by Christ, and used by him to describe the times in which he lived, ; and the prophet may be thought to have an eye to the same, while he is settling forth the badness of his own times; and the Jews seem to think he had a regard to them, since they say, that, when the Messiah comes, "the son shall dishonour his father", etc. plainly having this passage in view; and the; whole agrees with the times of Christ, in which there were few good men; it was a wicked age, an adulterous generation of men, he lived among; great corruption there was in princes, priests, and people; in the civil and ecclesiastical rulers, and in all ranks and degrees of men; and he that ate bread with Christ, even Judas Iscariot, lifted up his heel against him. The times in which Micah the prophet here speaks of seem to be the times of Ahaz, who was a wicked prince; and the former part of Hezekiah's reign, before a reformation was started, or at least brought about, in whose reigns he prophesied; though some have thought he here predicts the sad times in the reign of Manasseh, which is not so probable.

Verse 18
 Who is a God like unto thee, that pardoneth iniquity,
 and passeth by the transgression of the remnant of his heritage?
 he retaineth not his anger for ever,
 because he delighteth in mercy.
 "Who is a God like unto thee? The question seems to recall the prophet's own name (micha-yah), which means, "Who is like Jehovah?" and the clause in Moses' song, "Who is like unto thee, O Lord, among the gods?" Such comparisons are made from the standpoint of the nations who believe in the real existence of their false gods.
 "That pardoneth", and beareth and taketh away also, "and passeth by the transgression of the remnant of His heritage", that is, His heritage, which is a remnant still when "the rest are blinded" ; and this, not of its merits but of His mercy; since it is not His nature to "retain His anger forever"; not for anything in them, but "because He delighteth in mercy", as He saith, "I am merciful, saith the Lord, and I will not keep anger forever" . "I am He that blotteth out thy transgressions for Mine own sake, and will not remember thy sins" . Although God for a time is angry with His elect and chastens them mercifully in this life, yet in the end He has compassion on them and gives them everlasting consolations.
 "The remnant" — who shall be permitted to survive the previous judgment: the elect remnant of grace (Micah 4:7).

See also

Related Bible parts: Matthew 10, Luke 12, Philippians 2

Notes

References

Sources

External links

Jewish
Micah 7 Hebrew with Parallel English
Micah 7 Hebrew with Rashi's Commentary

Christian
Micah 7 English Translation with Parallel Latin Vulgate

07